Gates and Partners was an international law firm with its main base in the City of London.  The firm had offices in London, Brussels, Singapore and Dubai.

Gates and Partners specialised in aerospace, private equity and corporate/commercial law.

The firm was headed by Sean Gates, cited in the Euromoney Best of the Best Expert Guide 2009 as having received more nominations than any other aviation lawyer worldwide.  Sean Gates has also been ranked by Chambers UK Guide to the World's Leading Lawyers 2009 as the sole "star individual" for solicitors in aviation insurance and litigation. The firm is ranked in Band 1 for Aviation in the 2012 Chambers and Partners guide to the legal profession (UK).

History of the Firm 

The firm was founded in the City of London in 2003 by Sean Gates, Daniel Soffin and Adosh Chatrath, who were previously partners at the aviation law firm of Beaumont and Son. They were shortly followed by several others aviation law specialists, including Paul Freeman (another former Beaumont and Son partner, who had his own aviation practice in Australia), and John Korzeniowski (previously a partner at aviation specialists Thomas Cooper & Stibbard) and Aoife O’Sullivan (from Clifford Chance LLP). The Singapore office of the firm was headed by David Johnston (previously a partner at Barlow Lyde & Gilbert LLP), the Dubai office by Jim Edmunds (previously senior partner at Clyde & Co) and the Brussels office of the firm was headed and managed by Dimitri de Bournonville (former director legal and insurance of the TNT Express group).

The firm did grow at a rapid pace since its setting up (notably by gaining BA litigation work in 2004), and included a global team of around 60 lawyers.

On 1 June 2013 the entire firm merged with Kennedys Law LLP.

Areas of practice 

Gates and Partners was specialized in the following practice areas:

 Aerospace: Commercial, Disaster Management, Insurance and Reinsurance, Liability, Regulatory
 Alternative Dispute Resolution and Litigation
 Aviation "One-Stop" Disaster Response
 Corporate and Commercial
 EU and UK Competition Law
 Transport and Logistics
 Insolvency
 IT and IP
 Mergers and Acquisitions
 Offshore Structuring
 Outsourced Legal Services
 Private Equity and Venture Capital

The firm was also running an auditing service to evaluate airlines' disaster preparedness, in a joint venture with Kenyon International Emergency Services.

Offices 

The firm had 4 offices worldwide:

 London
 Singapore
 Brussels
 Dubai

Firm awards 

Awards received by Gates and Partners include the following:

 Chambers and Partners UK 2012: ranked in band 1 for its Aviation Practice.
 Chambers and Partners 2011 – “Gates and Partners is named amongst the top aviation law firms”.  Chambers notes the firm’s “stellar reputation for its insurance and liability practice”.
 Expert Guides, The Best of the Best 2011 – Sean Gates and David Johnston (partners of the firm) were named amongst the top 25 pre-eminent Aviation lawyers in the world.  Sean Gates was nominated again this year as number one Aviation Insurance lawyer in the world.
 Airfinance Journal 2010 – The Gates and Partners aircraft finance team was nominated as one of the world’s top ten law firms.  The team was commended in particular for best industry knowledge, most commercially aware law firm and most innovative firm.
 The International Who’s Who of Aviation lawyers 2011 – named Sean Gates, David Johnston, Paul Freeman, John Korzeniowski and Dan Soffin.
 Corporate Intl Magazine Legal Award 2010
 Winner of the Aviation Law Firm of the Year 2010 in England
 Dealmakers Global Award Winner 2011
 The Legal 500 2010 – Moved the firm up to one of the top spots with the legal 500 commenting that “the firm has an impressive reputation in the insurance market”.
 Who's Who Legal Awards 2010 have named Sean Gates Aviation Lawyer of the Year for the fourth year running this year.
 Belgian Legal Awards 2012: finalist for the Best Marketing Belgian Legal Award.
 Belgian Legal Awards 2011: the firm's Brussels office received the Belgian Legal Award 2011 for being the law firm with Highest Potential of the year, after less than 4 months of existence.

External links 
 Firm website
 Legal 500
 https://web.archive.org/web/20120317070211/http://corpjetfin.live.subhub.com/articles/Gates_and_Partners_reviews_BA_Europe_951
 http://www.laworld.com/news-and-publications/1-legal-news/75-gates-a-partners-secure-new-aviation-appointment.html

References 

Aviation law
Law firms based in London